Anantapur Urban Assembly constituency is a constituency of the Andhra Pradesh Legislative Assembly, India. It is one of 14 constituencies in the Anantapur district. 

 Anantha Venkatarami Reddy  is the present MLA of the constituency, who won the 2019 Andhra Pradesh Legislative Assembly election from YSR Congress Party.

Overview 
It is part of the Anantapur Lok Sabha constituency along with another six Vidhan Sabha segments, namely Rayadurg, Uravakonda, Tadpatri, Singanamala, Guntakal and Kalyandurg in Anantapur district.

Members of Legislative Assembly

Election results

Assembly elections 1952

Assembly Elections 2009

Assembly elections 2014

Assembly elections 2019

See also 
 Anantaptur (Assembly constituency)
 List of constituencies of Andhra Pradesh Legislative Assembly

References 

Assembly constituencies of Andhra Pradesh
Anantapur, Andhra Pradesh